The Christian Bloc is an electoral bloc in Ukraine. In the 30 September 2007 elections, the bloc failed to win parliamentary representation, winning 0,10% of the votes.

Member parties:
Social-Christian Party
All-Ukrainian Political Party "Ecology and Social Protection"

References

Political party alliances in Ukraine